The 2012 Superstars Series Monza round was the first round of the 2011 Superstars Series season. It took place on 10 April at the Autodromo Nazionale Monza.

Massimo Pigoli won the first race, starting from pole position, and Michela Cerruti gained the second one, both driving a Mercedes C63 AMG.

Classification

Qualifying

Race 1

Race 2

Standings after the event

International Series and Italian Championship standings

Teams' Championship standings

 Note: Only the top five positions are included for both sets of drivers' standings.

References

2011 in Italian motorsport
Superstars Series seasons